is a Japanese judoka. He won the bronze medal in the Openweight division at the 2010 World Judo Championships.
A very strong judoka, he stands 1.93 cm and weighs 150 kg.

External links
 

1985 births
Living people
Japanese male judoka
20th-century Japanese people
21st-century Japanese people